Follow That Man is a 1961 British comedy film directed by Jerome Epstein and starring Sydney Chaplin, Dawn Addams and Elspeth March.

The film's sets were designed by the art director William Hutchinson.

Cast
 Sydney Chaplin as Eddie Miller 
 Dawn Addams as Janet Clark 
 Elspeth March as Astrid Larsen 
 Joan Heal as Harriet 
 Peter Bull as Gustav 
 Jack Melford as Lars Toren 
 Gary Colleano as Axelrod 
 May Hallatt as Nannie 
 Philip Locke as Vicar 
 Mark Baker as Jack 
 Janet Joye as Anna 
 Nicholas Tannar as Olaf 
 Roland Brand as Charlie 
 Erik Chitty as Doctor 
 Brian Peck as Newsboy 
 Linda Castle as Jean 
 Michael Barrington as Hotel manager

References

Bibliography
 Brian McFarlane & Anthony Slide. The Encyclopedia of British Film: Fourth Edition. Oxford University Press, 2013.
 Howard Maxford. Hammer Complete: The Films, the Personnel, the Company. McFarland, 2018.

External links

1961 films
British comedy films
1961 comedy films
United Artists films
1960s English-language films
1960s British films